Ramón Alonso R. was a merchant steamship that was built in Scotland in 1898 and scrapped in Spain in 1959. Her original name was Montclair. She was renamed José Gallart in 1901, Balmes in 1911 and Ramón Alonso R. in 1929. Her first owner was the British Elder Dempster Lines, but she spent most of her career with a succession of Spanish owners. She was built as a transatlantic ocean liner with some cargo capacity, but in 1927 she was refitted as a cargo ship. In 1913, when she was called Balmes, the ship survived a serious cargo fire in mid-Atlantic.

Valetta and Montclair
Archibald McMillan and Son built the ship at Dumbarton, launching her 22 February 1898 as Valetta for Gow, Harrison and Company. She had a single screw, driven by a three-cylinder triple-expansion steam engine built by David Rowan and Son of Glasgow, rated at 339 NHP.

Before the ship was completed, Elder, Dempster bought Valetta for its transatlantic service between Britain and Canada. All Elder Dempster ships on that route had names beginning with Mont-, and the ship entered service as Montclair. Elder, Dempster registered Montclair at Liverpool. Her UK official number was 109407 and her UK code letters were QBWS.

José Gallart and Balmes
In 1901 A Folch y Compañía bought Montclair, renamed her José Gallart and registered her in Barcelona. Her Spanish code letters were HPTW. In 1905 ownership passed to the Sociedad Anónima de Navigacion Transatlántica. In 1911 Pinillos, Izquierdo y Companía acquired her, renamed her Balmes and registered her in Cádiz. By 1911 Balmes was equipped for wireless telegraphy. By 1913 her call sign was MYZ, but the international reorganisation of call signs in 1914 changed it to ECA.

Fire at sea

In November 1913 Balmes left Havana, Cuba carrying 103 passengers and a cargo of sugar, rum and raw cotton. On Thursday 13 November her crew discovered that fire had broken out in the cotton in her number two hold. Her crew fought the fire, and her wireless operator sent a distress signal. The Cunard Liner  received the signal and changed course to assist.

Pannonia arrived that evening, hove short astern of Balmes, and stood by overnight. At first light on Friday 14 November Pannonia launched four lifeboats, with which she rescued all 103 passengers from Balmes. Captain Juan Ruiz and his 55 crew remained aboard Balmes to continue fighting the fire and try to save their ship. The fire penetrated the timber bulkhead between the cargo hold and the stokehold, but Balmes engine room crew managed to keep steam up to keep the ship under way.

Two tugs from Bermuda, Gladisfen and Powerful, joined Pannonia to take Balmes in tow. With their assistance, Balmes reached St George's harbour in Bermuda on Sunday 16 November, where the fire was extinguished. Pannonia continued to New York, where she landed Balmes passengers at Ellis Island.

In 1925, ownership of Balmes passed to the Compañía Transoceanica de Navigacion, who registered her at Barcelona.

Ramón Alonso R.
In 1927, Hijo de Ramón Alonso Ramos acquired Balmes. They had her refitted with her passenger accommodation removed and her cargo capacity increased, and renamed her Ramón Alonso R.. By 1934 her call sign was EABX.

In 1938, during the Spanish Civil War, Nationalist insurgents gained control of the ship and operated her under the names Ramoni and Vietri. After the Civil War, Ramón Alonso R.s owners regained control of her and she continued in merchant trade. In March 1959 Montajes Erandio scrapped her in Bilbao.

References

1898 ships
1913 fires in North America
Maritime incidents in 1913
Merchant ships of Spain
Merchant ships of the United Kingdom
Passenger ships of Spain
Ship fires
Steamships of Spain
Steamships of the United Kingdom